Nelo Risi (21 April 1920 – 17 September 2015) was an Italian poet, film director, translator and screenwriter, brother of cinematographer Fernando Risi and director Dino Risi.

Biography
Born in Milan, Risi graduated in medicine, as did his brother Dino, then with the outbreak of the Second World War he fought on the Russian front and was interned in Switzerland. He started his poetical production in 1941, with the collection Le opere e i giorni. With the end of the war he moved to Paris where he joined a group of filmmakers, led by the Americans Richard Leacock and John Ferno, engaged in documenting the disaster of the war in Europe through a series of human-geography documentary films.  During this time Risi also published his second collection of poems (L'esperienza, 1948) and worked as a translator of poetry works by Pierre Jean Jouve, Constantine P. Cavafy, Sophocles, Jules Laforgue and others.

Back in Italy in 1954 he directed a dozen documentary films on popular figures and moments in the history of the twentieth century. He made his feature film debut in 1961, with a segment of the film Le italiane e l'amore; the same year he started his long collaboration with RAI TV. During his film career Risi won two Silver Ribbons, in 1960 for the direction of the short film The Brothers Rosselli (1959) and in 1970 for the screenplay of Diary of a Schizophrenic Girl. In 1970 he also won the Viareggio Prize for his poetry collection Di certe cose che dette in versi suonano meglio che in prosa. His poetry style is referred as "poetics of the usual" ("poetica dell'usuale"), in reference of the attempt of grasping the contradictions and the mystifications of everyday life through a basic, simple language, close to a diaristic style.

Selected filmography
Andremo in città (1966)
Diary of a Schizophrenic Girl (1968)
Dead of Summer (1970)
A Season in Hell (1971)
The Infamous Column (1973)

References

External links

1920 births
2015 deaths
Film people from Milan
Italian film directors
Italian screenwriters
Italian male screenwriters
Italian poets
Italian male poets
Italian documentary filmmakers
20th-century Italian translators
20th-century Italian male writers
Writers from Milan